William Knox was a Scottish professional footballer who played as a full back.

References

People from Douglas Water
Scottish footballers
Association football fullbacks
Burnley F.C. players
Luton Town F.C. players
Bristol City F.C. players
Stockport County F.C. players
English Football League players
Year of birth missing
Year of death missing
Bathgate F.C. players
Footballers from South Lanarkshire